Gelechia atlanticella is a moth of the family Gelechiidae. It is found in Morocco and Spain.

References

Moths described in 1955
Gelechia